Shona Rapira Davies  (born 1951) is a sculptor and painter of Ngātiwai ki Aotea tribal descent. Currently residing in Wellington New Zealand.

Education

Rapira Davies first studied at the Auckland College of Education, majoring in art, and later in Dunedin at Otago Polytechnic, graduating with a Diploma in Fine Arts in 1983. In 1989 she was awarded the prestigious Frances Hodgkins Fellowship and a residency for indigenous artists at the Banff Centre of the Arts in Canada.

Rapira Davies recalls she felt isolated in her identity while studying in Dunedin but the experience taught her the value of patience.

Career

She exhibits widely; both as a sculptor and as a painter. Rapira Davies is interested in the empowerment of Māori women in spite of perceived racism (in a Pākehā culture) and sexism (within the patriarchal structure of Māori tribal organisation). She uses her art work to make statements about perceived injustices against Māori.

She is well known for her landscape sculpture commission for Te Aro Park (previously called Pigeon Park) in central Wellington. The ceramic tile permanent work is considered one of New Zealand's most successful public sculptures. Set in a narrow triangle of public space with adjacent busy roads and much foot traffic it is a very visible work.

One of Rapira Davies' major works, the sculptural installation Nga Morehu (1988), the title of which translates to 'the survivors', is held by the Museum of New Zealand Te Papa Tongarewa, along with preparatory drawings. The work was originally made for Whakamamae ('to feel pain'), an exhibition Rapira Davies had with painter Robyn Kahukiwa at the Wellington City Art Gallery in 1988. Ngā Morehu pays tribute to the strength and resilience of Māori women. The  is mentioned by Rapira Davies as being the defining component of the piece. Her daughter completed the weaving after very little instruction, and which Rapira Davies describes as her journey into adulthood. Curator Megan Tamati-Quennell writes:

Reflecting the rise of the political Māori voice and the place of feminism in New Zealand art at the time, Ngā Morehu portrays the impact of colonisation on Māori culture and Māori women particularly. Yet Rapira Davies' work suggest transcendence too, by revealing a ritual state rarely portrayed, and through it, a Māori definition of beauty, status and worth. 

In 2015 Te Papa opened a focus exhibition on Rapira Davies and fellow senior artist Emily Karaka which includes Ngā Morehu alongside preparatory sketches and more recent works.

Exhibitions

Solo  

 Hone Heke, Art Attack Gallery, Dunedin. 1981
 Toku Whanau, Marshall Seifert Gallery, Dunedin. 1984
 Tangi, Marshall Seifert Gallery, Dunedin. 1985
 Wāhine, Wāhine, Marshall Seifert Gallery. 1985
 Kōrero au Taku Tamaiti, Bowen Galleries. 1986
 Ko Te Kihikihi, Govett-Brewster Art Gallery / Len Lye Centre. 2022 
 Ko Te Kihikihi Taku Ingoa, Govett-Brewster Art Gallery / Len Lye Centre. 2022

Selected group exhibitions 

 Māori Arts Festival, Women's Gallery, (also Hocken Library Gallery, Dunedin) Wellington. 1980
 Aramoana, City Art Gallery, Wellington. 1980
 ANZART, Christchurch Arts Centre, Christchurch. 1980 
 Content/Context, National Art Gallery of New Zealand, Wellington. 1986
 Whakamamae, Wellington City Art Gallery, 1988

Collections

Her works are held at Te Papa and Auckland Art Gallery Toi o Tāmaki.

References 

New Zealand women sculptors
New Zealand women painters
New Zealand Māori artists
1951 births
Living people
Ngāti Wai people
People associated with the Museum of New Zealand Te Papa Tongarewa
People from Great Barrier Island
Otago Polytechnic alumni
20th-century New Zealand sculptors
21st-century New Zealand sculptors
20th-century New Zealand women artists
21st-century New Zealand women artists